Akwaaba is a 2019 Ghanaian movie written and directed by Cornelius Phanthomas also known as Kobi Rana.

Plot
 Bishop Nyarko 
Gloria Osei Sarfo
 Efia Odo
 Moesha Boduong 
 Baby Blanche

External links
Akwaaba

References

Ghanaian drama films